John Holland Cazale (August 12, 1935 – March 13, 1978) was an American actor. He appeared in five films over seven years, all of which were nominated for the Academy Award for Best Picture: The Godfather (1972), The Conversation (1974), The Godfather Part II (1974), Dog Day Afternoon (1975), and The Deer Hunter (1978), with the two Godfather films and The Deer Hunter winning. Cazale started as a theater actor in New York City, ranging from regional, to off-Broadway, to Broadway acting alongside Al Pacino, Meryl Streep, and Sam Waterston. Cazale soon became one of Hollywood's premier character actors, starting with his role as the doomed, weak-minded Fredo Corleone opposite longtime friend Al Pacino in Francis Ford Coppola's film The Godfather and its 1974 sequel, as well as Sidney Lumet's Dog Day Afternoon. In 1977, Cazale was diagnosed with lung cancer, but he chose to  complete his role in The Deer Hunter. He died shortly after, in New York City on March 13, 1978.

Theatrical producer Joseph Papp called Cazale "an amazing intellect, an extraordinary person and a fine, dedicated artist". David Thomson writes that "It is the lives and works of people like John Cazale that make filmgoing worthwhile." A documentary tribute to Cazale, I Knew It Was You, was screened at the 2009 Sundance Film Festival featuring interviews with Al Pacino, Steve Buscemi, Meryl Streep, Robert De Niro, Gene Hackman, Richard Dreyfuss, Francis Ford Coppola, and Sidney Lumet.

Early life 
Cazale was born in Revere, Massachusetts, to an Irish-American mother, Cecilia Holland (1898–1997), and an Italian-American father, John Cazale (1897–1957). He had an older sister, Catherine (May 28, 1931 – February 2, 2000), and a younger brother, Stephen. He grew up in Winchester and attended high school at the Buxton School in Williamstown where he joined the drama club. He studied drama at Oberlin College in Ohio, transferring to Boston University, where he studied under Peter Kass.

Career

Theatre career 
Upon graduation, Cazale worked as a cab driver, as he started his theatrical career at the Charles Playhouse, appearing in Hotel Paradiso and Our Town in 1959. Reviewing his performance as George Gibbs in Our Town, critic Jean Pierre Frankenhuis said "[Cazale's] portrayal is absolutely stupendous, hilarious, touching, thrilling. We found ourselves wishing that there were more scenes with him, such is the enjoyable performance he gives: a  comedian of the first order!" Cazale moved to New York City and supported himself as a photographer while looking for acting work. He made one of his first appearances there in the Equity Library's production of Sidney Howard's Paths of Glory.

An Off-Broadway production of Archibald MacLeish's J.B. by the Equity Library Theatre followed on March 17, 1962, at the Master Theatre. He also acted in a 1962 short film entitled The American Way, directed by Marvin Starkman.

In 1965, Cazale was part of the National Tour of Lorraine Hansberry's The Sign in Sidney Brustein's Window

He worked as a messenger at Standard Oil, where he met Al Pacino, another aspiring actor. Pacino recalled: "When I first saw John, I instantly thought he was so interesting. Everybody was always around him because he had a very congenial way of expressing himself." In 1966, the two were cast in a play by Israel Horovitz, The Indian Wants the Bronx, playing at the Eugene O'Neill Theatre Center in Waterford, Connecticut. They reprised their roles in 1968 at the Off-Broadway Astor Place Theatre, for which they both won Obie Awards. That same year, Cazale won another Obie for his role as Dolan in Horovitz's Line.

In 1968, Cazale appeared in his only television role, playing Tom Andrews in the episode "The Peep Freak" on the cop drama N.Y.P.D.

In 1969, Cazale joined the Long Wharf Theatre Company, where he appeared for the next three seasons in a number of productions, including Tartuffe, The Country People, The Skin of Our Teeth, The Iceman Cometh, and You Can't Take It With You.

Cazale reprised his role in Line in a 1971 production at the Theatre De Lys (now the Lucille Lortel Theatre). Appearing with him were Richard Dreyfuss as Stephen, Barnard Hughes as Arnall, John Randolph as Fleming, and Ann Wedgeworth as Molly. During this run, Cazale was spotted by casting director Fred Roos, who then suggested him to director Francis Ford Coppola for the role of Fredo Corleone in The Godfather (1972).

Film career

The Godfather films (1972–74) 
The Godfather was Cazale's feature film debut. The film's star, Marlon Brando, was one of Cazale's idols. The film broke box office records and made Cazale and several other previously unknown co-stars famous. Coppola, impressed with Cazale's abilities in the small role, wrote the part of Stan for him in his next film, The Conversation (1974), in which he co-starred with Gene Hackman. In 1974, he reprised his role as Fredo Corleone, now significantly expanded, in The Godfather Part II. Bruce Fretts, in Entertainment Weekly, wrote that "Cazale makes his character’s wounded pride hauntingly palpable."

Dog Day Afternoon (1975) 
He again starred alongside Pacino in Sidney Lumet's 1975 film Dog Day Afternoon. The film's screenwriter Frank Pierson said "the film had been cast with many of the actors that Al Pacino had worked with in New York, including John Cazale, who was a close friend and collaborator in The Godfather." For his role as Sal he was nominated for the Golden Globe Award for Best Supporting Actor. Sidney Lumet declared:

Return to theatre

Public theatre (1975–76)
While achieving success in film, Cazale's commitment to the stage continued. In addition to his work with the Long Wharf Theatre, he appeared in a number of plays by Israel Horovitz. In May 1975, he returned to the Charles Playhouse to support Pacino in The Resistible Rise of Arturo Ui. Ross Wetzston of The Village Voice, reporting on the production, said Cazale "may be the finest actor in America today". In 1976, ten years after their first collaboration, Cazale and Pacino appeared together for the final time in the Public Theatre's production of The Local Stigmatic.

Measure for Measure (1976) 
In the summer of that year, Cazale starred at the Delacorte Theatre in Central Park with Sam Waterston in Shakespeare's Measure for Measure. His leading lady was the recent Yale School of Drama graduate Meryl Streep. Mel Gussow of The New York Times wrote: "Mr. Cazale, often cast as a quirky, weak outsider, as in The Godfather, here demonstrates sterner mettle as a quietly imperious Angelo who sweeps down, vulturelike, to deposit virtue." During the run of the play, Cazale and Streep began a romance and moved in together. Streep humorously praised her co-star's abilities by saying, "The jerk made everything mean something." Then she added, "Such good judgment, such uncluttered thought!"

Agamemnon (1977) 
Cazale's final stage appearance was on April 29, 1977, in the title role of Agamemnon at the Vivian Beaumont Theatre. He appeared only in the first preview. After the performance, he took ill and withdrew from the show. It was his only Broadway performance. Shortly afterwards, he was diagnosed with lung cancer.

Final film role: The Deer Hunter (1978) 
Despite the terminal diagnosis, Cazale continued work with his romantic partner, Meryl Streep, along with Robert DeNiro, Christopher Walken, and John Savage, in The Deer Hunter. According to author Andy Dougan, director Michael Cimino "rearranged the shooting schedule with Cazale and Streep's consent, so that he could film all his scenes first". He completed his scenes but died before the film was released. Cazale was considered all but uninsurable due to his illness, jeopardizing his participation in the film, but according to Streep the costs were paid by DeNiro, who wanted Cazale to be in it.

Death
Cazale was diagnosed with lung cancer in 1977 which was likely related to his history of chain smoking. Despite trying a number of treatments and protocols, he rapidly declined as the cancer metastasized to his bones. On March 13, 1978, Cazale died at the age of 42. Meryl Streep was at his side, as she had been throughout his illness. Close friend and Godfather co-star Al Pacino said "I've hardly ever seen a person [Streep] so devoted to someone who is falling away like John was. To see her in that act of love for this man was overwhelming." Of Cazale, Pacino would later lament that he was not better recognized for his skill, saying that Cazale "was one of the great actors of our time—that time, any time".

His close friend and frequent collaborator, Israel Horovitz, wrote a eulogy, published in The Village Voice on March 27, 1978. In it, he said:

John Cazale happens once in a lifetime. He was an invention, a small perfection. It is no wonder his friends feel such anger upon waking from their sleep to discover that Cazale sleeps on with kings and counselors, with Booth and Kean, with Jimmy Dean, with Bernhardt, Guitry, and Duse, with Stanislavsky, with Groucho, Benny, and Allen. He will make fast friends in his new place. He is easy to love.

Cazale was buried at Holy Cross Cemetery in Malden, Massachusetts.

Filmography 
Cazale appeared in six full-length feature films, all of which were nominated for the Academy Award for Best Picture. The Godfather, The Godfather Part II, and The Deer Hunter all won the award.

Theatre credits

Awards and nominations 
Cazale was cited twice for "Distinguished Performance" by the Off-Broadway Obie Awards in the 1967−1968 season for his performances in Israel Horovitz's plays The Indian Wants the Bronx and Line. His only major film acting recognition came in 1976, when he was nominated for a Golden Globe for Best Supporting Actor for Dog Day Afternoon. He lost to Richard Benjamin, who won the award for his work in The Sunshine Boys.

Although Cazale never received an Oscar nomination, according to Bruce Fretts, he "was the walking embodiment of the aphorism, 'acting is reacting,' providing the perfect counterbalance to his recurring co-stars, the more emotionally volatile Al Pacino and Robert De Niro". Cazale had learned to put the lack of recognition into context. While filming The Deer Hunter, he said to Pittsburgh Press reporter Edward L. Blank:  If you have any inclination toward paranoia, that sort of thing will bring it out in you. You say to yourself, "What do I have to do to get recognition of that sort?" Then you put it back into perspective and ask yourself how much that or any award really matters.

Despite his personal lack of awards recognition, Cazale is distinguished by the fact that all five feature films he starred in were nominated for the Academy Award for Best Picture. Even a sixth film, The Godfather Part III, in which archive footage of him was shown, received this nomination.

Legacy 

Cazale was described by those close to him to be "often shy" and "very emotionally sensitive". He collaborated with a number of artists repeatedly: Israel Horovitz dedicated the entire cycle of his "Wakefield Plays" to Cazale's memory, saying he "played in most of my plays, from 67–77, including Alfred the Great and Our Father's Failing." Directors James Hammerstein and Arvin Brown used him multiple times. He did two plays for Joseph Papp. Francis Ford Coppola was responsible for the majority of Cazale's film success, having cast him three times. Meryl Streep acted with him twice. Close friend and frequent co-star Al Pacino collaborated with him six times: on three films and three stage productions. Pacino once commented: "All I wanted to do was work with John for the rest of my life. He was my acting partner."

In an interview celebrating The Godfather 50th anniversary, when asked about actors that did not get enough credit, Al Pacino said:John Cazale, in general, was one of the great actors of our time — that time, any time. I learned so much from him. I had done a lot of theater and three films with him. He was inspiring, he just was. And he didn't get credit for any of it. He was in five films, all Oscar-nominated films, and he was great in all of them. He was particularly great in Godfather II and I don't think he got that kind of recognition.

In following generations, celebrated actors such as Philip Seymour Hoffman, Steve Buscemi, Sam Rockwell, and Michael Fassbender named Cazale as an influence.

The Boston Globe asked: "Why was Cazale so influential? In part, it was because of his commitment to the craft of acting." To Streep, he was "monomaniacal", which had an effect on his co-stars, who were then "challenged to take their own games up a notch".

Cazale has a theater named after him, the McGinn/Cazale Theatre (currently inhabited by the company Second Stage Theatre), located at 2162 Broadway at 76th Street in New York City. The theatre is co-named for Cazale and his friend, the actor Walter McGinn, who had died in a car accident in 1977. The theatre was dedicated on March 12, 1984.

His life and career were profiled in the documentary film, I Knew It Was You, directed by Richard Shepard, which premiered at the 2009 Sundance Film Festival.

All five of the films that he starred in would later be selected for preservation in the U.S. National Film Registry of the Library of Congress.

Notes 
 Cazale died at approximately 3 a.m. on Monday, March 13, 1978, which is the date on his gravestone and confirmed by his brother, Stephen. His date of death has been commonly reported as March 12, 1978, due to contemporary newspaper reports referencing his death occurring on "Sunday night".

References

External links 
 
 
 
 eFilmCritic.com Interview with director Richard Shepard on the John Cazale Documentary I Knew It Was You
 Natural Born Plumbers: John Cazale and the Character Actors of the 1970s
 
 John Cazale: Stepped Over at Alternate Takes

1935 births
1978 deaths
20th-century American male actors
American male film actors
American people of Irish descent
American people of Italian descent
Boston University College of Fine Arts alumni
Male actors from Massachusetts
Oberlin College alumni
People from Revere, Massachusetts
Deaths from lung cancer in New York (state)
Obie Award recipients
Buxton School (Massachusetts) alumni